The Erzurum Subregion (Turkish: Erzurum Alt Bölgesi) (TRA1) is a statistical subregion in Turkey.

Provinces 

 Erzurum Province (TRA11)
 Erzincan Province (TRA12)
 Bayburt Province (TRA13)

See also 

 NUTS of Turkey

External links 
 TURKSTAT

Sources 
 ESPON Database

Statistical subregions of Turkey